Tasaka Guri-Guri is a shop located in Kahului, Maui, Hawaii that specializes in a frozen dessert known as guri-guri. Guri-guri is a cross between sherbet and ice cream. It is typically made with a mixture of guava juice, any type of lime soda, and condensed milk. Tasaka Guri-Guri is very protective of the recipe and has kept it a family secret for decades.

History
Jokichi Tasaka first made guri-guri in the early 1900s while living in Japan. Jokichi called the dessert goodie-goodie, as in something "good" to eat. His son Gunji Tasaka came to realize that it was difficult for the older Japanese people to pronounce the name, so he began to call it guri-guri. Gunji Tasaka later migrated to the United States and continued to run the family business.

Tasaka Guri-Guri has operated for over 100 years but has relocated several times. The Tasaka family's business started with a store on Pu'unene Avenue in Kahului, Maui. The Tasaka family relocated from that store to one in Wailuku, where they stayed for about 1 year. Tasaka and family then moved to The Old Kahului Shopping Center in Kahului where they stayed for many years. They have been located in Maui Mall in Kahului, since 1973.

Tasaka Guri-Guri was honored in 2009 by the Japanese Cultural Center of Hawaii for being "one of five local businesses that have stood the test of time and become inspiring stories of success."

Products

Guri-Guri
The typical ingredients of guri-guri are a mixture of flavored juices, guava juice, lemon-lime soda, and condensed milk. However, Tasaka Guri-Guri's recipe has been kept a secret for over a century. The latest to know the recipe are Henry Tasaka, who is retired from the shop, and his two daughters, Gail and Cindy Tasaka, who have now taken over the family business.

Guri-guri comes in two flavors: pineapple and strawberry. Strawberry is more popular.

References

Food and drink companies based in Hawaii
Frozen desserts
Family-owned companies of the United States